Gnomonia fructicola is a fungal plant pathogen on strawberries causing leaf spot disease. It can overwinter on leaves and fruits of Fragaria spp. (Rosaceae), occasionally pathogenic on fruits causing strawberry stem-end rot. The causal organism has often been referred to as Gnomonia comari, now considered Gnomoniopsis comari. It occurs in Canada (British Columbia), Europe (Belgium, France) and U.S.A. (MD, NY).

References

External links

Fungal strawberry diseases
Gnomoniaceae